Clementson is an unincorporated community in Lake of the Woods County, Minnesota, United States.

The community is located east of Baudette on Minnesota State Highway 11.

References

Further reading
Rand McNally Road Atlas - 2007 edition - Minnesota entry
Official State of Minnesota Highway Map - 2007/2008 edition

Unincorporated communities in Minnesota
Unincorporated communities in Lake of the Woods County, Minnesota